Meykhvaran-e Pir Ali Khan (also Romanized as Meykhvārān-e Pīr ‘Alī Khān; also known as Maekharān, Makhrān, Meykhowrān-e Farmānfarmā, Meykhvārān-e Farmānfarmā, Meykhvorān-e Farmān Farmā, and Pīr Meykhvārān-e Pīr ‘Alī Khān) is a village in Bavaleh Rural District, in the Central District of Sonqor County, Kermanshah Province, Iran. At the 2006 census, its population was 275, consisting of 53 families.

References 

Populated places in Sonqor County